Gielniów  is a village in Przysucha County, Masovian Voivodeship, in east-central Poland. It is the seat of the gmina (administrative district) called Gmina Gielniów. The village has a population of 1,100.

History
Gielniów used to be a town from 1455 until either 1869 or 1870. It received Magdeburg rights due to efforts of a local nobleman Tomasz Mszczuj of Brzezinki. Until the Partitions of Poland, Gielniów belonged to Lesser Poland's Sandomierz Voivodeship, but it remained a very small town, whose population was app. 100 (as for the mid-17th century). In 1815 - 1915, Gielniów was part of Russian-controlled Congress Poland, losing its town charter after the failed January Uprising. In the mid-19th century, its population was app. 500, and after losing the charter, Gielniów declined.

References

External links
 Jewish Community in Gielniów on Virtual Shtetl
 

Villages in Przysucha County
Lesser Poland
Radom Governorate
Łódź Voivodeship (1919–1939)